Denis Emanuel Rodríguez (born 21 March 1996) is an Argentine footballer who plays as an attacking midfielder for Amora.

Club career

Born in Rosario, Santa Fe, Rodríguez is a youth exponent from hometown club Newell's Old Boys. He made his Argentine Primera División on 12 July 2015 against Racing Club de Avellaneda in a 3–0 home win. On 28 September he scored his first goal in a 2–0 win at Estudiantes de La Plata.

In July 2018, Rodríguez was loaned for a year to Club Atlético Belgrano for a net fee of US$50,000, with the option to purchase 50% of his economic rights for around $2.12 million. Halfway through his loan to the club from Córdoba, having played only eight games, his deal was rescinded by new manager Diego Osella.

During a training session in late August 2020, Rodríguez suffered a ruptured Achilles tendon, an injury that was estimated to keep him out for 6–8 months. While recovering from his injury, in June 2021 Rodríguez was involved in a road accident after colliding with a police motorcycle. The police motorcycle involved was in pursuit of a third party before colliding with Rodríguez's car. As of February 2022, he had still not returned to play for Newell's.

On 22 August 2022, Rodríguez signed for Portuguese Liga 3 side Amora.

Personal life
He is the twin brother of Alexis Rodríguez and cousin of Maxi Rodríguez. All three played together for Newell's.

References

External links
 

1996 births
Living people
Argentine footballers
Argentine expatriate footballers
Footballers from Rosario, Santa Fe
Association football midfielders
Argentine Primera División players
Newell's Old Boys footballers
Club Atlético River Plate footballers
Club Atlético Belgrano footballers
Amora F.C. players
Argentine expatriate sportspeople in Portugal
Expatriate footballers in Portugal